Gisela Dulko and Flavia Pennetta won in the final 6–2, 0–6, 10–5, against Nuria Llagostera Vives and María José Martínez Sánchez.

Seeds

Draw

Brackets

External links
 Draw

Swedish Open - Women's Doubles
Swedish Open
2009 in Swedish women's sport
Swedish